The Compulsory Border Guard Service (German: Grenzschutzdienstpflicht) was enacted by the German parliament in the Federal Border Protection Act of 18 August 1972, based on Article 12a of the German Constitution. The remaining provisions of the Federal Border Protection Act were repealed in 1994. However, compulsory border guard service has not been enforced since 1973. Anyone who serves or served in the Federal Border Guard (German: Bundesgrenzschutz (BGS)) can no longer be assigned to the military service (§ 42a Conscription Law) in the German Federal Armed Forces (German: Bundeswehr). In 2005 the border guard was renamed the Bundespolizei (BPOL) (Federal Police) and any mandatory service would be performed there.

History 
The implementation of compulsory border guard service has to be seen in a historical context. Until the 1980s the BGS was organized as a paramilitary force that could be deployed nationwide, either at the inner-German border, but also elsewhere in case of civil disorder. Domestic military operations of any kind on the territory of West Germany were prohibited for the Bundeswehr at that time. The BGS used heavy military equipment and the officers were officially combatants until 1994. Furthermore, the member states of the Warsaw Pact maintained a very large number of Internal Troops, mainly staffed by conscript soldiers like the East German  Volkspolizei-Bereitschaften (VPB). Interior troops were a considerable reinforcement of the infantry forces during the arms race of the Cold war period and were not affected by disarmament negotiations as they were not part of the regular military.

After the "German Emergency Acts" (German: Notstandsgesetze) were enacted in 1968, the tasks of the BGS changed slowly. The military task was gradually reduced, because in a State of Defence (German: Verteidigungsfall or V-Fall) the Bundeswehr was and still is thereafter empowered in very limited circumstances to be deployed in domestic disturbances. Nevertheless, the BGS was equipped with light and medium infantry weapons until the mid-eighties and still, now nominated as Bundespolizei maintains armoured personnel carriers like the LAPV Enok or Mowag Eagle.

Drafting of Border Guards 
Men at the age of eighteen, or older if they were former members of the Federal Police or if they had not previously served in the military or federal police, can be drafted to the border guard service. Mandatory service can be introduced if there are not enough volunteers joining the federal police. If the need is covered by volunteers at a later date, currently drafted persons are to be released. The employment status of the draftees is similar to the status during military service. The service is divided into border protection basic service, border protection exercises and perpetual border protection service in case of defense and in the cases mentioned in article 91 of the constitution. After their service has been completed, members are transferred to the border guard reserve.

Current enforcement of the draft 
Similar to the suspended conscription for military service since 2011, the compulsory border guard service is legally paused since 1994, but can be reactivated anytime by a resolution of the parliament.

See also 
 Border guards
 Border guards of the inner German border
 Civil conscription
 Internal Troops
 Law enforcement in Germany

References 

German federal agencies
1972 establishments in Germany